The Kishinev pogrom or Kishinev massacre was an anti-Jewish riot that took place in Kishinev (modern Chișinău, Moldova), then the capital of the Bessarabia Governorate in the Russian Empire, on . A second pogrom erupted in the city in October 1905. In the pogrom of 1903, which began on Easter Day, 49 Jews were killed, 92 were gravely injured, a number of Jewish women were raped, over 500 were lightly injured and 1,500 homes were damaged. American Jews began large-scale organized financial help, and assisted in emigration. The incident focused worldwide attention on the persecution of Jews in Russia and led Theodor Herzl to propose the Uganda Scheme as a temporary refuge for the Jews.

History

The most popular newspaper in Kishinev, the Russian-language anti-Semitic newspaper Бессарабец (Bessarabets, meaning "Bessarabian"), published by Pavel Krushevan, regularly published articles with headlines such as "Death to the Jews!" and "Crusade against the Hated Race!" (referring to the Jews). Another newspaper, Свет (Svet, "Light") made similar insinuations. These allegations sparked the pogrom.

The pogrom began on April 19 (April 6 according to the Julian calendar, then in use in the Russian Empire) after congregations were dismissed from church services on Easter Sunday. In two days of rioting, 47 (some put the figure at 49) Jews were killed, 92 were severely wounded and 500 were slightly injured, 700 houses were destroyed, and 600 stores were pillaged. The Times published a forged dispatch by Vyacheslav von Plehve, the Minister of Interior, to the governor of Bessarabia, which supposedly gave orders not to stop the rioters. Unlike the more responsible authorities at Dubăsari, who acted to prevent the pogrom, there is evidence that the officials in Kishinev acted in collusion or negligence, turning a blind eye to the impending pogrom.

On 28 April, The New York Times reprinted a Yiddish Daily News report that was smuggled out of Russia:

The Kishinev pogrom of 1903 captured the attention of the international public and was mentioned in the Roosevelt Corollary to the Monroe Doctrine as an example of the type of human rights abuse which would justify United States involvement in Latin America. The 1904 book The Voice of America on Kishinev provides more detail as does the book Russia at the Bar of the American People: A Memorial of Kishinef.

Russian response

The Russian ambassador to the United States, Count Arthur Cassini, characterised the 1903 pogrom as a reaction of financially hard-pressed peasants to Jewish creditors in an interview on 18 May 1903:

There is a memorial to the 1903 pogrom in modern Kishinev.

Aftermath
American media mogul William Randolph Hearst "adopt[ed] Kishinev as little less than a crusade", according to Stanford historian Steven Zipperstein. As part of this publicity, Hearst sent the Irish nationalist journalist Michael Davitt to Kishinev as "special commissioner to investigate the massacres of the Jews", becoming one of the first foreign journalists to report on the pogrom.

Due to their involvement in the pogrom, two men were sentenced to seven and five years' imprisonment respectively and a further twenty-two to one or two years.

This pogrom was instrumental in convincing tens of thousands of Russian Jews to leave for the West or Palestine. As such, it became a rallying point for early Zionists, especially what would become Revisionist Zionism, inspiring early self-defense leagues under leaders like Ze'ev Jabotinsky.

1905 pogrom

A second pogrom took place  in Kishinev on 19–20 October 1905. This time, the riots began as political protests against the Tsar, but turned into an attack on Jews wherever they could be found. By the time the riots were over, 19 Jews had been killed and 56 were injured. Jewish self-defense leagues, organized after the first pogrom, stopped some of the violence, but were not wholly successful. This pogrom was part of a much larger series of 600 pogroms that swept the Russian Empire at the time.

Cultural references

Russian authors such as Vladimir Korolenko wrote about the pogrom in House 13, while Tolstoy and Gorky wrote condemnations blaming the Russian government—a change from the earlier pogroms of the 1880s, when most members of the Russian intelligentsia were silent. Tolstoy worked with Sholem Aleichem to produce an anthology dedicated to the victims, with all publisher and author proceeds going to relief efforts, which became the work Esarhaddon, King of Assyria. Sholem Aleichem went on to write the material for the famous Fiddler on the Roof.

It also had a major impact on Jewish art and literature. After interviewing survivors of the Kishinev pogrom, the Hebrew poet Chaim Bialik (1873–1934) wrote "In the City of Slaughter," about the perceived passivity of the Jews in the face of the mobs. In the 1908 play by Israel Zangwill titled The Melting Pot, the Jewish hero emigrates to America in the wake of the Kishinev pogrom, eventually confronting the Russian officer who led the rioters.

More recently, Joann Sfar's series of graphic novels titled Klezmer depicts life in Odessa, Ukraine, at this time; in the final volume (number 5), Kishinev-des-fous, the first pogrom affects the characters. Playwright Max Sparber took the Kishinev pogrom as the subject for one of his earliest plays in 1994. The novel The Lazarus Project by Aleksander Hemon (2008) provides a vivid description of the pogrom and details its long-reaching consequences.

In Brazil, the Jewish writer Moacyr Scliar wrote the fiction and social satire book "O Exército De Um Homem Só" (1986), about Mayer Guinzburg, a Brazilian-Jew and Communist activist whose family are refugees from the Kishinev pogrom.

Monument to victims

The Victims of Chișinău Pogrom Monument is a memorial stone to the victims of Kishinev pogrom, unveiled in 1993 in Alunelul park Chișinău, Moldova.

See also
History of the Jews in Moldova
Jacob Bernstein-Kogan

References

Bibliography

Further reading
Judge, Edward H. Easter in Kishinev: Anatomy of a Pogrom. NYU Press 1992.

Schoenberg, Philip Ernest. "The American Reaction to the Kishinev Pogrom of 1903". American Jewish Historical Quarterly 63.3 (1974): 262–283.
Zipperstein, Steven J. Pogrom: Kishinev and the Tilt of History. Liveright Publishing March 2018.

External links
Kishinev Pogrom unofficial commemorative website
Resources about the pogrom
"Are Jewish men cowards?" Interview in Chicago Jewish Cafe with Prof. Steven Zipperstein, the author of "Pogrom: Kishinev and the Tilt of History."

 
1903 in the Russian Empire
April 1903 events
History of Chișinău
Mass murder in 1903
1903 murders in the Russian Empire